Digerronden is a mountain in Dovre Municipality in Innlandet county, Norway. The mountain is surrounded by several other notable mountains including Midtronden and Høgronden to the east; Rondeslottet to the south; Veslesmeden, Storsmeden, Sagtindene, and Trolltinden to the southwest; Gråhøe and Vassberget to the west; and Stygghøin to the northwest.

Name
The first element is diger which means "huge" or "enormous". The last part of the name is -ronden which is the finite plural of the word rond. Several mountains in the area have the ending -ronden (Digerronden, Høgronden, Midtronden, Storronden and Vinjeronden), and this is the finite singular of the same word. The word rond was probably originally the name of the long and narrow lake such as Rondvatnet and the mountains surrounding the lake were then named after this lake.

See also
List of mountains in Norway by height
List of mountains of Norway

References

Dovre
Mountains of Innlandet